A Summer in La Goulette is a 1996 film by Tunisian director Férid Boughedir. It is a narrative of how intercommunal relations deteriorated in cosmopolitan La Goulette after the end of French rule, especially Muslim-Jewish relations affected by the Six-Day War and the rising impact of Islam on Tunisian society.

The film also features La Goulette native Claudia Cardinale as herself. The film was entered into the 46th Berlin International Film Festival.

Plot 
Youssef (Mustapha Adouani) is a Muslim who works on the TGM and lives in La Goulette. His best friends are Jewish Jojo the brik seller and Sicilian Catholic Giuseppe the fisherman, who are also his neighbours. Their daughters grow up together and share their prospects for life, but the landlord Hadj Beji (Gamil Ratib) has his eyes on Youssef's daughter Meriem (Sonia Mankaï).

Cast
 Gamil Ratib : Hadj Beji
 Mustapha Adouani : Youssef
 Guy Nataf : Jojo
 Ivo Salerno : Giuseppe
 Michel Boujenah : TSF
 Claudia Cardinale : herself
 Sonia Mankaï : Meriem 	
 Ava Cohen-Jonathan : Tina 	
 Sarah Pariente : Gigi
 Kais Ben Messaoud : Chouchou
 Mohamed Driss : Miró

See also 
Le Chant des mariées

References

External links

1996 films
French coming-of-age drama films
1990s French-language films
1990s Arabic-language films
1990s Italian-language films
Films about race and ethnicity
1990s coming-of-age drama films
Films set in Tunisia
Films set in 1967
Films directed by Férid Boughedir
Works about the Six-Day War
1996 drama films
1996 multilingual films
French multilingual films
Tunisian multilingual films
Belgian multilingual films
1990s French films